The 2009 Bayern Rundfahrt was the 30th edition of the Bayern Rundfahrt cycle race and was held on 27 May to 31 May 2009. The race started in Kelheim and finished in Gunzenhausen. The race was won by Linus Gerdemann.

General classification

References

Bayern-Rundfahrt
2009 in German sport